Flaco is a male Eurasian eagle-owl which escaped his long-time enclosure at Central Park Zoo in New York City and took up residence in Central Park in February 2023. As an exotic species in North America, and one which was confined to a small enclosure in a zoo, his escape attracted significant public and press attention. There were concerns for the bird's ability to feed itself after being captive for so long, without the need to fly or hunt, but he was seen successfully catching and eating rats a week later. Attempts to recapture Flaco continue, alongside a petition to allow him to remain free, and ongoing concerns over other dangers of the park, like rodenticide.

Background 

The Eurasian eagle-owl (Bubo bubo) is a species of eagle-owl that resides in much of Eurasia. This bird has distinctive ear tufts, with upper parts that are mottled with darker blackish coloring and tawny. The wings and tail are barred. The underparts are a variably hued buff, streaked with darker coloring. The facial disc is not very defined and the orange eyes are distinctive. They are nocturnal predators, mostly eating small mammals such as rodents and rabbits, as well as occasional larger mammals and birds of varying sizes. They are found in many habitats, but are mostly birds of mountainous regions or other rocky areas, often those near varied woodland edge and shrubby areas with openings or wetlands to hunt a majority of their prey. Within their range, they have been known to live in city parks, but no part of their range overlaps with North America.

Flaco was taken to the Central Park Zoo when he was less than a year old and had lived in captivity there for 12 years at the time of his escape. His enclosure was about the size of a bus stop, according to Gothamist, with fake rocks, a few branches, and a painted backdrop. It was located in the Temperate Territory part of the zoo, near a theater and the Penguins and Sea Birds building.

Vandalism and escape 
On February 2, 2023, someone vandalized Flaco's enclosure at  the zoo. The owl escaped through the new hole in the exhibit's stainless steel mesh, and zoo employees noticed he was gone at around 8:30 PM. Prompted by the Wild Bird Fund, a wildlife rehabilitation hospital, NYPD officers unsuccessfully attempted to capture the owl when he was seen Thursday night near the Bergdorf Goodman Building on Fifth Avenue in Manhattan. He was found in a tree in the southern part of Central Park the next day, and has spent time in various parts of Central Park, including the Hallett Nature Sanctuary, the area around the zoo, and even in the zoo's crane enclosure.

The vandal or vandals have not been identified as of February 14.

Monitoring and attempts to recapture 

Soon after his escape, zoo staff began efforts to recapture Flaco, monitoring him around the clock for the first several days. Owls are generally difficult to capture. A typical strategy is to lure them with food, and zoo employees tried without success to bait Flaco with dead rats. The first attempt was with a bal-chatri trap, a baited trap covered in wire loops which snare a bird's talons when they try to get to the prey. It was placed on the park's Heckscher Ballfields, with zoo staff hidden nearby with nets. Flaco did go for the rat and briefly got one of his talons caught, but managed to free himself. The employees were instructed not to speak to the press, but several anonymously expressed frustration and exhaustion in news reports.

Public attention to Flaco in Central Park quickly led to national news coverage and comparisons to other New York City "celebrity" birds like the mandarin duck seen in Central Park in 2018. ABC News wrote that he had become the city's newest tourist attraction. Zoo officials and some other birders criticized the sharing of the bird's location on social media. Publicly sharing the location of owls is a controversial practice among birders, and in New York City in particular. Owls like Flaco are nocturnal hunters and roost during the day, when crowds of people, some of whom even make loud sounds like hooting to get their attention for a photograph, can disturb their ability to rest. The crowds which formed to look at Flaco may have also made him less likely to take food from the zoo's traps.

Local birders and zoo officials speculated that Flaco would have a difficult time surviving after such a long time in captivity, since he did not have reason to develop his flight and hunting skills in that time. There were no reports of him eating in his first several days after escape but on February 10 he produced a mass of undigested animal parts called a pellet, which owls regurgitate some time after eating. The Wildlife Conservation Society (WCS), the organization which runs the Central Park Zoo and other zoos in the area, released a statement on February 12 saying that its staff had observed improved flight skills and had seen Flaco successfully hunting and eating. With recapture less urgent to his survival, and concerned that aggressive methods might scare him to an area where he is either less able to take care of himself or less visible, WCS said zoo staff would scale back and redesign their efforts. Later the same week, the WCS said another attempt to use bait and eagle-owl calls failed, and would stop trying to capture him, but would continue to monitor his well-being and be prepared to try to intervene if necessary. With the news that he had hunted successfully, a petition began to allow Flaco to remain free.

Although Flaco has successfully hunted, living in Central Park has other risks like vehicle traffic and rodenticide. Rats are plentiful prey, and the prevalent use of rat poison in the city has made poisoning a common cause of death for raptors. Another owl, a barred owl known as Barry, was killed in the park in 2021 when she collided with a maintenance vehicle, perhaps affected by the quantity of rat poison inside her. Although the Central Park Conservancy, the organization which runs the park, has said it is not currently using rat poison, rodenticide is still in use in the surrounding area.

See also 

 Birding in New York City
 List of individual birds

References 

2023 in New York City
Birds in popular culture
Central Park
Individual animals in the United States
Individual birds of prey
Missing or escaped animals